The Fifth Estate, formerly known as The D-Men, is an American rock band formed in 1963 in Stamford, Connecticut.

Early years (as The D-Men)

The  band  began in Stamford, Connecticut, in 1963, as The D-Men. Early on, as The D-Men, the band played many small shows and local clubs but soon gravitated to Greenwich Village and larger clubs where they often played six nights a week for long stretches. Guitarist Carl Sabatini also played a role in the band's earliest conception. They released three singles, two on Veep/United Artists and one on the Kapp labels, which along with much of their later material have become collectors' items and established them as a central part of the garage rock movement.  Boston Skyline released a 28-song collection of their music in 1993 and published a 41-page booklet of their story.

The band made a number of appearances on television, including several on the Clay Cole Show, with one featuring The Rolling Stones’ first American East Coast TV appearance, and Hullabaloo, on which the D-Men performed "I Just Don't Care".  The program was at that time co-hosted by Brian Epstein, who expressed an interest in signing them.  They later won a Murray the K call-in contest for best new release over The Dave Clark Five and The Animals in 1965. In 1966 they changed their name to "The Fifth Estate".

The Fifth Estate
The Fifth Estate released the single "Love Is All A Game" on the Red Bird label, which became a regional hit. Following a successful string of club performances, they had an international hit in 1967 with a sunshine pop version of "Ding-Dong! The Witch Is Dead", which reached No. 11 on the Billboard Hot 100. The song was recorded and released around the world in five different languages (Japanese, Italian, French, German and English), and incorporated parts of "La Bouree" in the instrumental break and coda from Terpsichore by 17th-century composer Michael Praetorius. According to Cashbox, the track is in the Top 100 record releases of 1967 and achieved the highest American chart position of any Harold Arlen or Wizard of Oz song. That same year, the group recorded their version of "Heigh Ho!", another film theme, this time from Disney's first feature length film, 1937's Snow White and the Seven Dwarfs. Although it made the top 40 on the Canadian CHUM chart, sales for both "Heigh Ho!" and their next single, "Do Drop Inn", proved disappointing in the US. "Heigh Ho!" failed to chart and "Do Drop Inn" skimmed the bottom of the American charts. Although not making an impact in America, in 1968 "Morning Morning", an original song that incorporated the band's core guitar and harpsichord driven sound, was a hit in Australia on the Stateside label.

The original five members performed together for six years during which they recorded about 100 songs, and released 13 singles and one album. Sam & Dave joined them on stage and sang "Soul Man" with them at one of their theater shows, while one of the Vandellas sang and recorded one of their tunes, "How Can I Find A Way," with them as her next release.  They also appeared in a 1967 TV episode of Malibu U.  In 1968, on "The Frodis Caper", the last of their 58 television show episodes, The Monkees covered The Fifth Estate's version of "Ding Dong! The Witch Is Dead".
 
The Fifth Estate toured with acts such as Count Five, The Electric Prunes, The Music Explosion, The Buckinghams, The Ronettes, Gene Pitney, The Lovin' Spoonful, The Turtles, The Byrds, The Easybeats.  They also appeared on Upbeat with another Greenwich Village band, The Velvet Underground.

In 1970, group members went off on different projects. Bill Shute released two albums with Lisa Null, The Feathered Maiden and Other Ballads (1977) and American Primitive (1980), and multiple albums with other collaborators. The band has since reformed and continue to perform and record. Their album Time Tunnel was recorded in 2010/11 and released on January 2, 2012.  It was produced with the assistance of and mixed by Shel Talmy.

On September 19, 2012, The Fifth Estate - Anthology 1 was released by Fuel 2000/Universal Music Group. A double CD with a 20-page booklet and 40 songs, more than half the tracks were previously unreleased.

In May, 2014, the German label Break-A-Way Records released a 14-song vinyl album of the band's early 1964 - 1966 material called I Wanna Shout!

On August 12, 2014, following the continued success of the 2012 Anthology 1 release, Fuel 2000 released a 14-song CD of new material, Take The Fifth. This album was also mixed and executive-produced by Shel Talmy.

Members
 Rick Engler - guitar, fuzz bass, lead vocals, harmonica
 Ken 'Furvus' Evans - drums, vocals
 Doug 'Duke' Ferrara - bass, lead harmony vocals
 Wayne 'Wads' Wadhams (died 19 August 2008) - harpsichord, piano, organ, lead vocals
 Bill Shute - guitar, shugro 8, vocals 
 Chuck LeGros - vocals, harmonica (1966)
 Bob 'Bobby Lee' Klein - lead vocals, keyboards, guitar (1969 + 2006-)

Discography

Singles
as The D-Men
 "Don't You Know" b/w "No Hope For Me" (Veep/United Artists 1206 / July 1964)
 "I Just Don't Care" b/w "Messin Around" (Veep/United Artists 1209 / March 1965)
 "So Little Time" b/w "Every Minute of Every Day" (Kapp 691 / May 1965)

as The Fifth Estate
 "Love Is All a Game" b/w "Like I Love You" (Red Bird RB 10-064 / May 1966)
 "Ding Dong! The Witch Is Dead" b/w "Rub-a-Dub" (Jubilee 45-5573 / May 1967)
 "The Goofin Song" b/w "Lost Generation" (Jubilee 5588 / July 1967)
 "Heigh-Ho" b/w "It's Waiting There for You" (Jubilee 5595 / October 1967)
 "Morning, Morning" b/w "Tomorrow Is My Turn" (Jubilee 5607 / November 1967)
 "Do Drop Inn" b/w "That's Love" (Jubilee 5617 / February 1968)
 "Coney Island Sally" b/w "Tomorrow Is My Turn" (Jubilee 5627 / July 1968)
 "Night on Fire" b/w "I've Never Been So High" (3 members as Medicine Mike) (Evolution 1011 / August 1969)

In 1969, two singles by studio musicians were released under the band's name without their permission or participation:

 "The Mickey Mouse Club March" b/w "I Knew You Before I Met You" (Jubilee 5655 / April 1969)
 "Parade of the Wooden Soldiers" b/w "I Knew You Before I Met You" (Jubilee 5683 / November 1969)

Albums
 Ding Dong! The Witch Is Dead (Jubilee Records JGS 8005 / 1967)
 Ding Dong! The Witch Is Back: 1964-1969 (Boston Skyline BSD 116/1992)
 Time Tunnel (Roxon Records LLC RR1001 / 2011)
 The Fifth Estate - Anthology 1 1964-1969 (Fuel 2000 / Universal Music Group, 2012)
 I Wanna Shout! (Break-A-Way Records 039 / 2014)
 Take The Fifth (Fuel 2000 Records 302 062 017 2 / 2014)
 Surf, Rocks & Fuzz (Roxon Records LLC RR1002 / 2016) - 1963 & 1964 recordings
 I Wanna Shout! (Roxon Records LLC RR1003 / 2016) - digital and vinyl, 1965 recordings
 On The Road (Roxon Records LLC RR1004 / 2016) - 1966 recordings
 The Best Of - The Fifth Estate (Roxon Records LLC RR1005 / 20016) - 1964 to 1970 recordings
 Higher Density (Roxon Records LLC RR1006 / 2016) - 1968 recordings
 Live, Loud & Lo-Fi (Roxon Records LLC RR1007 / 2016) - 1964 to 2012 live recordings
 Garunge Deluxe (Roxon Records LC RR1008 / 2020) - more garage and RnR material

References

Roxon, Lillian: Lilian Roxon's Rock Encyclopedia, (Grosset and Dunlop, Universal Library Edition, 1972), p. 182,

External links
 The Fifth Estate Official Site

Rock music groups from Connecticut
American garage rock groups
American folk rock groups
Musical groups established in 1963
1963 establishments in Connecticut
Jubilee Records artists